Litoria richardsi is a species of frog in the family Hylidae, endemic to Papua New Guinea and Indonesia.  Scientists have seen it about 80 m above sea level.

The adult male frog measures approximately 26.5 mm in snout-vent length and the adult female frog 29.5 mm.  The webbed skin of the front and hind limbs is black in color.  The belly is black, white, and yellow in color.  The outermost part of the tympanum is clear.  Scientists are not sure how this frog is related to other species in Litoria.

References

Amphibians described in 2006
Endemic fauna of Indonesia
Endemic fauna of Papua New Guinea
Frogs of Asia
richardsi